Jason Michael Welch (born November 2, 1989, in Walnut Creek, California) is an American amateur wrestler. As a high school wrestler at Las Lomas High School in Walnut Creek, California, Welch was the 13th wrestler ever to win 3 state championships. In 2008, Welch graduated and signed with Northwestern University in Evanston, Illinois. Welch is a four-time national qualifier and in 2011, became an NCAA All-American. He is a three-time All-American.

Career

High school 

Jason Welch attended Las Lomas High School from 2004 to 2008. While at Las Lomas, he lettered in varsity soccer, football, and wrestling. According to Intermatwrestle.com, Welch was the top ranked high school wrestler when he signed to Northwestern University.

College 
Entering Northwestern in 2008, Welch started for the Northwestern Wildcats as a true freshman. As a true freshman, he qualified for the NCAA Wrestling National Championship Tournament. As a redshirt sophomore Welch qualified for the NCAA tournament again and placed 6th after losing to Bubba Jenkins of Arizona State in the semi-finals to earn All-American honors. In 2011, during Welch's red shirt junior season, he was invited to wrestle at the 46th NWCA All-Star Classic where he beat Ganbayar Sanjaa of American University. Welch placed 4th for All-American honors his red-shirt junior year. Welch won the famed 49th Midlands tournament hosted by his home school, Northwestern and led Northwestern to its highest team place at the tournament with the Wildcats placing 2nd overall behind Iowa. In 2013, Welch won a Big Ten championship and placed 2nd at the NCAA championships, making him a 3-time NCAA All-American.

Personal life

Welch graduated as an English Major at Northwestern University. He was born in Walnut Creek, California to John and Barbara Welch. Welch coached wrestling at Loyola Academy and now coaches at San Francisco State University 
In his first year at SF State he managed to produce two NCAA qualifiers and helped the young team beat Cal Baptist for the first time in years.

References

1989 births
Living people
Sportspeople from Walnut Creek, California
Northwestern Wildcats wrestlers